The 2020–21 Canisius Golden Griffins men's basketball team represented Canisius College in the 2020–21 NCAA Division I men's basketball season. The Golden Griffins, led by fifth-year head coach Reggie Witherspoon, played their home games at the Koessler Athletic Center in Buffalo, New York as members of the Metro Atlantic Athletic Conference. They finished the season 7–6, 7–5 in MAAC play to finish in a tie for fifth place. As the No. 6 seed in the MAAC tournament, they lost in the first round to No. 11 seed Rider 76–78.

Previous season
The Golden Griffins finished the 2019–20 season 12–20, 7–13 in MAAC play to finish in tenth place. They lost in the first round of the MAAC tournament to Iona.

Roster

Schedule and results 

|-
!colspan=12 style=| MAAC regular season

|-
!colspan=12 style=| MAAC tournament
|-

|-

Source

References

Canisius Golden Griffins men's basketball seasons
Canisius Golden Griffins
Canisius Golden Griffins men's basketball
Canisius Golden Griffins men's basketball